Albedo is a measure of reflectivity.

Albedo may also refer to:

Arts, entertainment, and media
 Albedo (Ben 10), a character in the Ben 10 franchise.
 Albedo, a character from the video game Genshin Impact.
 Albedo, a character from the light novel and anime series Overlord
 Albedo, a character in the video game series Xenosaga
 Albedo 0.39, a 1976 album by the artist Vangelis
 Albedo Anthropomorphics, a comic book anthology
 Albedo (role-playing game), derived from the comics
 Albedo One, an Irish horror, fantasy, and science fiction magazine founded in 1993

Other uses
 Albedo (alchemy), a stage of alchemical progression
 Albedo, the mesocarp of a fruit
 Albedo Telecom, a telecommunications hardware company based in Madrid, Spain

See also